"Dandelions" is a song by Canadian singer Ruth B., originally released as a promotional single from her 2017 album Safe Haven. It was re-issued separately in a "slowed + reverb" version in August 2021. In 2022, the song charted internationally after going viral on TikTok.

Background
Ruth B. called the track "probably the lightest and cutest song" on Safe Haven and said she started writing it after watching an interview with Sia, part of whose advice on songwriting was to choose a "pretty word" to "write around". Ruth B. then "look[ed] out the window" several weeks later and "saw a dandelion, and [...] started writing the song" in part because she thought "dandelion" was a "pretty word".

Charts

Weekly charts

Year-end charts

Certifications

Release history

References

2017 songs
Ruth B. songs
Number-one singles in India